Andrew William Nembhard (born January 16, 2000) is a Canadian professional basketball player for the Indiana Pacers of the National Basketball Association (NBA). He played college basketball for the Florida Gators and the Gonzaga Bulldogs.

College career

Nembhard was recruited to the University of Florida from Montverde Academy in Montverde, Florida. In his freshman season with the Gators, he started every game and tallied the fourth-highest freshman assist total in school history. After averaging 8.0 points, 2.9 rebounds and 5.4 assists, and finishing fifth in the Southeastern Conference (SEC) in assist-turnover ratio, Nembhard was named to the conference all-Freshman team. Just a few days later, Nembhard hit a buzzer-beater to upset Louisiana State University (LSU) in the 2019 SEC tournament.

Nembhard declared for the 2019 NBA draft, but ultimately chose to return to the Gators for his sophomore season. As a sophomore, Nembhard averaged 11.2 points, 5.6 rebounds, and 3.0 assists per game and led the SEC with a 2.2 assist-to-turnover ratio. Following the season he declared for the 2020 NBA draft but hired an NCAA-certified agent, allowing him the option to return to Florida. On May 30, 2020, Nembhard withdrew from the draft and entered the NCAA transfer portal.

On June 23, 2020, Nembhard announced that he would transfer to Gonzaga. He chose the Bulldogs over offers from Duke, USC, Memphis, Georgetown and Stanford. He was granted a waiver for immediate eligibility on November 24.

In his first Gonzaga season, he primarily came off the bench (though he played more minutes per game than two Bulldogs starters), averaging 9.2 points, 2.4 rebounds, and 4.4 assists per game for a team that entered its conference tournament unbeaten. Nembhard was named the West Coast Conference's inaugural Sixth Man of the Year, and was also named to the all-conference second team. He averaged 11.8 points, 5.8 assists, 3.4 rebounds and 1.6 steals per game as a senior. Nembhard was named to the First Team All-WCC. On April 21, 2022, Nembhard declared for the 2022 NBA draft, forgoing his remaining college eligibility.

Professional career

Indiana Pacers (2022–present)
Nembhard was selected with the 31st overall pick by the Indiana Pacers. Nembhard joined the Pacers' 2022 NBA Summer League roster. In his Summer League debut, Nembhard scored five points, five rebounds, and five assists in a 96–84 win over the Charlotte Hornets. On July 22, 2022, Nembhard signed a four-year, $8.6M rookie contract with the Pacers, the largest rookie contract ever given to a second-rounder. On November 28, Nembhard scored a buzzer-beating, game-winning three-pointer in a 116–115 win over the Los Angeles Lakers. On December 5, with Tyrese Haliburton injured, Nembhard scored a career-high 31 points, 13 assists, 8 rebounds, and 5 three-pointers in a win over the Golden State Warriors. On January 31, 2023, Nembhard was named a 2023 NBA Rising Star alongside standout rookie teammate Bennedict Mathurin.

National team career
Nembhard represented Canada in FIBA competition at the U-16, U-17 and U-18 levels. In 2019, he made the senior national team for the 2019 FIBA World Cup.

Career statistics

College

|-
| style="text-align:left;"| 2018–19
| style="text-align:left;"| Florida
| 36 || 36 || 32.9 || .414 || .347 || .764 || 2.9 || 5.4 || 1.2 || .1 || 8.0
|-
| style="text-align:left;"| 2019–20
| style="text-align:left;"| Florida
| 31 || 31 || 33.2 || .441 || .308 || .775 || 3.0 || 5.6 || 1.1 || .1 || 11.2
|-
| style="text-align:left;"| 2020–21
| style="text-align:left;"| Gonzaga
| 32 || 16 || 29.9 || .480 || .323 || .754 || 2.4 || 4.4 || 1.1 || .1 || 9.2
|-
| style="text-align:left;"| 2021–22
| style="text-align:left;"| Gonzaga
| 32 || 32 || 32.2 || .452 || .383 || .873 || 3.4 || 5.8 || 1.6 || .1 || 11.8
|- class="sortbottom"
| style="text-align:center;" colspan="2"| Career
| 131 || 115 || 32.1 || .446 || .343 || .790 || 2.9 || 5.3 || 1.2 || .1 || 10.0

Personal life
Nembhard is the son of Mary and Claude Nembhard. His younger brother Ryan plays basketball for Creighton.

References

External links

Gonzaga Bulldogs bio
Florida Gators bio

2000 births
Living people
2019 FIBA Basketball World Cup players
Basketball people from Ontario
Canadian expatriate basketball people in the United States
National Basketball Association players from Canada
Canadian men's basketball players
Florida Gators men's basketball players
Gonzaga Bulldogs men's basketball players
Indiana Pacers draft picks
Indiana Pacers players
Montverde Academy alumni
Point guards
Sportspeople from Aurora, Ontario